Scolecocampa atriluna is a species of moth in the family Erebidae. It is found in North America.

The MONA or Hodges number for Scolecocampa atriluna is 8515.

References

Further reading

 
 
 

Scolecocampinae
Articles created by Qbugbot
Moths described in 1903